Barry Foster Newman (born November 7, 1938) is an American actor of stage, screen and television  known for his portrayal of Kowalski in Vanishing Point, and for his title role in the 1970s television series Petrocelli. He has been nominated for Golden Globe and Emmy awards.

Early life
Newman was born in Boston, Massachusetts, the son of a Belarusian-born mother, Sarah (née Ostrovsky), and an Austrian father, Carl Newman. Newman graduated from the prestigious Boston Latin School in 1948. He was a childhood friend of actor Leonard Nimoy.

After graduating from Brandeis University with a degree in anthropology in 1952, Newman was drafted into the army, and having learned saxophone and clarinet in high school, he was assigned to the 3rd Army band in Atlanta. After being discharged, Newman went to New York to receive his master's degree in anthropology from Columbia University, when a friend, who was studying acting with Lee Strasberg, invited him to sit in on a class. His destiny changed as he fell in love with acting and left Columbia University after only five weeks to study acting with Strasberg.

Career
Newman's first acting job was in Herman Wouk's first comedy Nature's Way, in which he played a jazz musician. New York critic Richard Watts called him "The creme of the Jesters". This role was followed by a featured part in the play Maybe Tuesday, written by Mel Tolkin.

Newman starred in the New York production of Agatha Christie's The Mousetrap. After numerous parts on Broadway, including the musical What makes Sammy Run, Sidney Kingsley's Night Live, America Hurrah,, Newman went on to do TV and movies. While working at nights on Broadway in What Makes Sammy Run, Newman starred as attorney John Barnes in the daytime drama The Edge of Night for two years. Earlier, Newman co-starred in his first film, the gangster potboiler Pretty Boy Floyd (1960), and he made his breakthrough with his first starring role in The Lawyer (1970). Newman starred in the 1971 cult movie Vanishing Point, followed by starring roles in 20th Century Fox's Salzburg Connection and Paramount's Fear Is the Key. In 1974, Petrocelli, a TV series created around the character Newman first played in The Lawyer, debuted on NBC and ran two seasons.

After Petrocelli, Newman starred in the film City on Fire with Henry Fonda and Ava Gardner, then in Disney's Amy. He starred or co-starred in more than 20 TV movies of the week, including ABC's King Crab, which won the ABC Theater Award. He also co-starred in several miniseries, including Fatal Vision. Variety called Newman "The Spencer Tracy of the 80s".

In 1989, Barry Newman starred with Suzanne Pleshette in the television series Nightingales. In the early 1990s, Newman starred in the BBC's production of The Mirror Cracked. During the 1990s, Newman co-starred in Daylight, Bowfinger, and The Limey.

Vanishing Point
Director Richard C. Sarafian's original choice for the role of Kowalski was Gene Hackman, but 20th Century Fox insisted on using Newman. The film was not initially a success in the United States when it first opened in 1971, but received critical acclaim and was a commercial success in Europe. Since its release it has developed a cult following.

Newman's success with the TV movie Night Games, based on the 1970 movie The Lawyer, led to the TV series Petrocelli, starring Newman as a lawyer who lives and works in the fictional town of San Remo, Arizona (filmed in Tucson, Arizona). He was nominated for an Emmy in 1975 for Outstanding Lead Actor in a Drama Series, and in 1976, for a Golden Globe.

Awards and nominations
 1975, Petrocelli, Emmy for Best Actor, nominated
 1976, Petrocelli, Golden Globe for Best Actor in a Drama Series, nominated

Selected filmography

 Pretty Boy Floyd (1960) ... Al Riccardo
 The Lawyer (1970) ... Tony Petrocelli
 Vanishing Point (1971) ... Kowalski
 Fear Is the Key (1972) ... John Talbot
 The Salzburg Connection (1972) ... Bill Mathison
 City on Fire (1979) ... Dr. Frank Whitman
 Amy (1981) ... Dr. Ben Corcoran
  Having It All (1982 film)  ... Peter Baylin
 Deadline (1982) ... Barney Duncan
 Fantasies (1982) ... Detective Flynn
 Second Sight: A Love Story (1984) ... Richard Chapman
 My Two Loves (1986) ... Ben
 The Mirror Crack'd from Side to Side (1992, TV) ... Jason Rudd
 Daylight (1996) ... Norman Bassett
 Brown's Requiem (1998) ... Jack Skolnick
 Goodbye Lover (1998) ... Sen. Lassetter
 The Limey (1999) ... Jim Avery
 Bowfinger (1999)... Hal Mclean
 Fugitive Mind (1999) ... Dr. Chamberlain
 G-Men From Hell (2000)... Greydon Lake
 Jack the Dog (2001)... Simon
 True Blue (2001) ... Monty
 Good Advice (2001) ... Donald Simpson
 40 Days and 40 Nights (2002) ... Walter Sullivan
Manhood (2003) ... Frank
 What the Bleep Do We Know!? (2004) ... Frank
 Grilled (2006) ... Boris

Selected television work
 The Edge of Night (1956) (Cast Member 1964–1965)
 Way Out (1961) ... Officer Police (1 episode, "Hush-Hush")
 Armstrong Circle Theatre (1963) ... (1 episode, 1963)
 Naked City (1963) "Beyond This Place There Be Dragons" ... Cabbie
 Get Smart (1965) ... Assistant Guru (1 episode, 1968)
 The Tonight Show Starring Johnny Carson ... Himself (3 episodes, 1973–1975)
 Petrocelli (1974) ... Anthony J. Petrocelli (45 episodes, 1974–1976)
 Dinah! (1975) ... (Cast Member 1975-1977)
 Quincy M.E. (1976)
 The Fall Guy (1981) Himself (1 episode: "The Detectives", season #4, episode #6, 1984)
 Nightingales (1989) ... Dr. Garrett Braden (13 episodes, 1989)
 Murder She Wrote (1989) ... Detective Jack Ballinger (1 episode, 1989)
 The New Hollywood Squares (1989) .... Special Guest(1 episode, 1989)
 L.A. Law (1994) ... Frank Askoff (2 episodes, 1994)
 NYPD Blue ... Jimmy Wexler (2 episodes, 1994–1998)
 The O.C. (2005) ... Professor Max Bloom (3 episodes, 2005)
 The Cleaner (2009) ... Marcus O'Hara (1 episode "Hello America")
 Ghost Whisperer (2009)... Ray James (1 episode "Till Death Do Us Start")
 Murder, She Wrote (1988)..."Snow White, Blood Red”, alleged NYPD ex-cop Ed McMasters

References

Petrocelli: San Remo Justice: An Episode Guide and Much More, by Sandra Grabman, published by BearManor Media

External links

1938 births
Living people
American people of Austrian-Jewish descent
American people of Belarusian-Jewish descent
American male film actors
American male stage actors
American male television actors
Boston Latin School alumni
Brandeis University alumni
Male actors from Boston
People from Winchester, Massachusetts